The 1990 United States House of Representatives elections in West Virginia were held on November 6, 1990 to determine who will represent the state of West Virginia in the United States House of Representatives. West Virginia has three seats in the House, apportioned according to the 1980 United States Census. Representatives are elected for two-year terms.

Overview

District 1 
 

Incumbent Democrat Alan Mollohan was re-elected unopposed. This district covers the northern part of the state.

District 2 
 

Incumbent Democrat Harley O. Staggers, Jr. defeated Republican Oliver Luck. This district covers the Eastern part of the state.

District 3 
 

Incumbent Democrat Bob Wise Was re-elected to a fourth term facing no opponent. This district covers much of the central and western portions of the state as well as the capital of Charleston.

District 4 
 

Incumbent Democrat Nick Rahall defeated Republican Marianne R. Brewster. This district covers the Southern part of the state.

References 

1990 West Virginia elections
West Virginia
1990